Lollicup Coffee & Tea (Chinese: 樂立杯; pinyin: lè lì bēi), rebranded as Lollicup fresh, is a Taiwanese American chain of tea shops founded by Lollicup USA, Inc., with headquarters in Chino, California. The company was founded in 2000 by Alan Yu and Marvin Cheng, and has 38 branches in the United States and China. Formerly known as Lollicup Tea Zone, the fast food chain specializes in bubble tea and coffee.

Lollicup USA, Inc., is listed in the Inc. 5000 list of fastest-growing privately held companies in America, with a rank of 2939 for its 3-year growth of 123% and an estimated revenue of $60 million in 2013.

History

The first Lollicup Coffee & Tea was opened in San Gabriel, CA in 2000 by its founders Alan Yu and Marvin Cheng. Lollicup began its trademark licensing program, which allowed the licensees (operators) to maintain complete control over the store without having to pay a royalty fee. By 2004, over 150 stores opened nationwide. Due to inconsistency and poor quality control, Lollicup closed its trademark licensing program after many branches closed.

Advertising
Lollicup's slogan is "Happiness You Can Taste".

Locations
, a total of 38 branches operate in US and China. With three branches operated by corporate in Alhambra, CA, Los Angeles, and Riverside, CA, corporate opened its first international location in Chengdu, China in 2012. Newer locations have a modern and updated design, featuring digital menu boards and digital promotional screens.

United States 36 stores
China 2 stores (Chengdu)

References

External links
 Official website

2000 establishments in California
Tea houses
Restaurants in California
Restaurants in China
Coffeehouses and cafés in the United States
Coffeehouses and cafés in China
Companies based in San Bernardino County, California